The men's 400 metre breaststroke was a swimming event held as part of the swimming at the 1920 Summer Olympics programme. It was the third and last appearance of the event.

A total of 20 swimmers from ten nations competed in the event, which was held from Sunday, August 22 to Wednesday, August 25, 1920.

Records

These were the standing world and Olympic records (in minutes) prior to the 1920 Summer Olympics.

Results

Quarterfinals

The fastest two in each heat and the fastest third-placed from across the heats advanced.

Quarterfinal 1

Quarterfinal 2

Quarterfinal 3

Quarterfinal 4

Semifinals

The fastest two in each semifinal and the faster of the two third-placed swimmer advanced to the final.

Semifinal 1

Semifinal 2

Final

References

External links
 
 

Swimming at the 1920 Summer Olympics
Men's events at the 1920 Summer Olympics